Anthocleista grandiflora, commonly known as the forest fever tree, is a member of the family Gentianaceae. It is a tall, slender tree up to 30 m with a preference for forests in high rainfall areas. The leaves are very large, up to 100 cm x 50 cm, arranged in terminal clusters.

Range and habitat
It is native to the mountains and escarpments of eastern Africa, from Uganda and Kenya in the north to South Africa and Eswatini in the south. In Zimbabwe it is limited to the Eastern Highlands and in South Africa it occurs mostly along rivers in and below the escarpment, and less often in lowveld riparian fringes. It is the only member of the Gentianaceae that reaches tree size in South Africa.

References

External links
 
 

grandiflora
Flora of Africa